Lorenzo 1994 is the sixth studio album by Italian singer-songwriter Jovanotti, released by Mercury Records on 10 January 1994.

The album peaked at number one on the Italian Albums Chart. The album was preceded by the single "Piove", "Penso positivo" and "Serenata Rap".
The album was ranked number five on Rolling Stone 's "100 Greatest Italian Albums of All Time".

Track listing

Charts and certifications

Charts

Certifications

References

1994 albums
Jovanotti albums
Mercury Records albums
Italian-language albums